Kim Dong-jin (born 1982) is a South Korean footballer.

Kim Dong-jin may also refer to:
 Kim Dong-jin (referee) (born 1973)
 Kim Dong-jin (footballer, born 1992), South Korean footballer
 Kim Dong-jin (composer) (1913–2009)